Bruce Craig Threadgill (born May 7, 1956 in Nocona, Texas) was a quarterback for the National Football League, Canadian Football League, and the United States Football League.  He played safety (and briefly in one game at quarterback) for the San Francisco 49ers in 1978 and was claimed off waivers by the New York Giants in 1979, but was released before the season began. He played quarterback for the Calgary Stampeders from 1979-1982 and the Houston Gamblers from 1984-1985.

References

External links
Houston Gamblers bio

1956 births
American football quarterbacks
Canadian football quarterbacks
San Francisco 49ers players
Calgary Stampeders players
People from Nocona, Texas
Mississippi State Bulldogs football players
Houston Gamblers players
Living people